Alfdan De Decker (born 9 September 1996) is a Belgian cyclist, who currently rides for UCI Continental team .

Major results
2016
 2nd Grote Prijs Stad Sint-Niklaas
2017
 1st Stage 2 Ronde van Midden-Nederland
2018
 Course de Solidarność et des Champions Olympiques
1st Stages 2 & 4
 2nd Schaal Sels
 2nd Grand Prix Criquielion
 3rd Grand Prix de la Ville de Lillers
 10th Grand Prix de la ville de Pérenchies
2019
 3rd Grote Prijs Marcel Kint
 8th Ronde van Limburg

References

External links

1996 births
Living people
Belgian male cyclists
People from Brasschaat
Cyclists from Antwerp Province